Thomas Rowe  (20 July 1829 – 14 January 1899) was a British-born architect, builder and goldminer who became one of Australia's leading architects of the Victorian era. He was also a politician, who was the first Mayor of Manly.

Early life
Thomas Rowe was born in Penzance, Cornwall, United Kingdom, the eldest son of Richard Rowe and Ursula Mumford, and attended Barnes Academy. At 15 he became a draftsman in his father's building business before the family emigrated to Australia in 1848. From 1857 he practised as an architect in Sydney, Bathurst, Orange, Newcastle and Goulburn. As an architect he was often successful in competitions and his firms built commercial premises, large houses and many Methodist churches.

Political career
In 1872 he was elected alderman for Bourke Ward of the Sydney City Council, which he held until 1876. During his time on the council he worked on sanitation efforts related to improving the Sydney water supply. Rowe Street, which runs from Pitt Street to Castlereagh Street, was at that time named after him by in a vote by the council.

In February 1877 he was elected to the first Manly Municipal Council and was elected first Mayor of Manly, overseeing the first laying-out of the town of Manly, and serving as an alderman until 1880.

Military career
Rowe was also involved in the volunteer NSW Colonial Forces, receiving a commission as a lieutenant in the newly formed New South Wales Corps of Engineers in 1872, and was promoted to the rank of captain in 1874.

When the Colonial Volunteer Force was disbanded and reorganised as the NSW Defence Force in 1878, Rowe was recommissioned a captain, and promoted to major in 1880. Raised to rank of brevet Lieutenant Colonel in 1886, Rowe undertook a European tour the following year, visiting Aldershot, Chatham, Enfield, and Woolwich, in search of information relating to defence matters. Rowe later designed several entrenching tools for the use of the engineers corps, including a bullet-proof shovel. Following the return to England of Colonel Henry Renny-Tailyour in 1894, Rowe took up the position of Commander of the New South Wales Corps of Engineers, was promoted to the rank of Colonel in 1895, and served until his retirement on 30 June 1898.

Later life and career
Rowe was also the founder, and for many years president, of the New South Wales Institute of Architects, and was elected a Fellow of the Royal Institute of British Architects in 1884.

In 1888 the Premier Sir Henry Parkes appointed Rowe as the first President of the Board of Water Supply and Sewerage, and served in that office until his death, with the exception of the period 1892 to 1896 when Cecil West Darley presided. His presidency was well-received, with an account after his death noting: "The great leaps and bounds by which the department has progressed, and its present state of efficiency, bear ample testimony to the capability of his administration."

He died age 69 in January 1899 at Mona, his leased residence since 1881 in Darling Point. In accordance with his wishes "to be laid to rest near the sea", he was buried in his military uniform at Waverley Cemetery following a service at St Mark's Church, Darling Point.

Key works
(Many of the following buildings are heritage-listed):

 Chatswood South Uniting Church, Artarmon, New South Wales (1871)
 Presbyterian Church, Bridge Road, Glebe, New South Wales (1881)
 Original Randwick Borough Chambers (later Parish Centre of St Jude's Church, Randwick) (1862)
 Catherine Hayes Building (based on design by John Horbury Hunt), Prince of Wales Hospital, Randwick, New South Wales (1870)
 Tresco, Elizabeth Bay, New South Wales (1868)
 F.L. Kelly and Company Building, Yass, New South Wales (1869)
 St Paul's Presbyterian Church, Hill End, New South Wales (1872)
 Presbyterian Church, Bathurst (1871)
 Holy Trinity Anglican Church, Orange (1879)
 Aliiolani Hale, Honolulu, Hawaii (1872)
 Great Synagogue, Elizabeth Street, Sydney (1874)
 Former Stanmore Methodist Church (1874), now part of the Newington College drama centre
 Sydney Hospital, including Nightingale Wing, Macquarie Street, Sydney (1879)
 Newington College, Founders Wing including Prescott Hall, Stanmore (1878)
 Sydney Arcade, Pitt Street, Sydney (1874)
 Vickery's Building, Pitt Street, Sydney (1874)
 Former Petersham Town Hall, Petersham (1882; extended 1892, demolished 1937)
 Former Stanmore Methodist Parsonage (1886), now Headmaster's residence, Newington College
 Ashton, Elizabeth Bay Road, Elizabeth Bay
 Imperial Arcade, Sydney (1891)

Architectural partners
 W. B. Field
 Sydney Green
 Alfred Spain

Harry Ruskin Rowe

Rowe's son Harry Ruskin Rowe was also successful as an architect. One of his most significant achievements was the creation in 1950 of Ruskin Rowe, an estate in the Sydney suburb of Avalon. Rowe acquired a house, The Cabbage Trees, in the estate and used it as a weekender. The estate still exists and is heritage-listed.

References

1829 births
1899 deaths
Military personnel from Cornwall
People from Penzance
Australian people of Cornish descent
British emigrants to Australia
Australian ecclesiastical architects
Gothic Revival architects
New South Wales architects
19th-century Australian architects
19th-century Australian politicians
19th-century Australian military personnel
Mayors of Manly, New South Wales
Australian Army officers
Australian military engineers
Public servants of New South Wales
Burials at Waverley Cemetery